Cronkhite–Canada syndrome is a rare syndrome characterized by multiple polyps of the digestive tract. It is sporadic (i.e. it does not seem to be a hereditary disease), and it is currently considered acquired and idiopathic (i.e. cause remains unknown).

About two-thirds of patients are of Japanese descent and the male to female ratio is 3:2.  It was characterized in 1955 by internal medicine physician Leonard Wolsey Cronkhite Jr. and radiologist Wilma Jeanne Canada.

Signs and symptoms
Polyps are found throughout the GI tract (most frequently in the stomach and large intestine, followed by the small intestine) though typically avoid the esophagus. A biopsy will reveal them to be hamartomas; the possibility that they progress to cancer is generally considered to be low, although it has been reported multiple times in the past. Chronic diarrhea and protein-losing enteropathy are often observed. Possible collateral features include variable anomalies of ectodermal tissues, such as alopecia, atrophy of the nails, or skin pigmentation

Causes
The cause of the disease is unknown. It was originally thought that the epidermal changes were secondary to profound malnutrition as a result of protein-losing enteropathy. Recent findings have called this hypothesis into question; specifically, the hair and nail changes may not improve with improved nutrition.

Other conditions consisting of multiple hamartomatous polyps of the digestive tract include Peutz–Jeghers syndrome, juvenile polyposis, and Cowden disease. Related polyposis conditions are familial adenomatous polyposis, attenuated familial adenomatous polyposis, Birt–Hogg–Dubé syndrome and MUTYH.

Diagnosis
There is no specific test to diagnose Cronkhite–Canada syndrome. Diagnosis is based on symptoms and features of the disease.

Management
Nutritional support is fundamental, and may include dietary guidance, supplements, tube feeding, or intravenous solutions. Treatments proposed include cromolyn sodium and prednisone, as well as histamine (H2) receptor antagonists or proton pump inhibitors.

References

External links 
 

Syndromes of unknown causes
Gastrointestinal tract disorders
Rare syndromes
Genodermatoses
Genetic disorders with OMIM but no gene
Syndromes affecting the gastrointestinal tract